Juan Evangelista Venegas (December 27, 1928 – April 16, 1987) was a Puerto Rican boxer notable for winning Puerto Rico's first Olympic medal.

Early years
Venegas  (birth name: Juan Evangelista Venegas Trinidad) was born in an underprivileged section of the town of Río Piedras. Río Piedras at the time was not incorporated into the City of San Juan, Puerto Rico. There street fighting was a common way of life and many of the youth at that time saw the sport of boxing as a way to a better life. Among them was Venegas, who admired Puerto Rico's first international boxing champion, Sixto Escobar. Venegas took up boxing and his performance in the ring soon caught the attention of the island's recently established Olympic Committee. In 1948 the Puerto Rican Olympic Committee included him in the delegation which would represent the island.

1948 Summer Olympics
The 1948 Summer Olympics celebrated in London, was a historical one for Puerto Rico because it was the first time that the island would participate as a nation in an international sporting event. The island's delegation consisted of twelve members. In their opening ceremonies, the Puerto Rican delegation carried the flag of the United States into the Olympic stadium.  The United States protested, claiming that two nations could not use the same flag at the same time. The decree of Commonwealth on July 25, 1952, would give the Puerto Rican delegation a flag of their own.

In the 1948 Summer Olympics, known as the XIV Olympics, Juan Evangelista Venegas made Puerto Rican sports history by winning Puerto Rico's first Olympic medal ever when he beat Belgium's representative, Louis Callenboat, on points for a unanimous decision. He won the bronze medal in boxing in the Bantamweight division, falling short of the silver medal to Giovanni Zuddas.

1948 Olympic results
Below are the results of Juan Evangelista Venegas who competed as a bantamweight boxer for Puerto Rico at the 1948 London Olympics:

 Round of 32: defeated Louis Calebout (Belgium) on points
 Round of 16: defeated Babu Lall (India) on points
 Quarterfinal: defeated Albert Perera (Ceylon) on points
 Semifinal: lost to Tibor Csik (Hungary) on points
 Bronze-Medal bout: defeated Alvaro Vicente (Spain) on points (won bronze medal)

Professional boxing career
After returning to a hero's welcome to Puerto Rico, Venegas turned professional. In 1948, Venegas made his professional boxing debut against Puerto Rican Abelardo Alejandro.  Venegas, a southpaw, fought in the bantamweight and featherweight division for a total of 32 fights, compiling a record of 20-10-2. His last fight was in 1958 against Al Tisi.

Death and legacy

On April 16, 1987, Juan Evangelista Venegas died when he suffered a fall at his home which caused a skull fracture. A week before his death, he was honored by the College of Engineers and Surveyors of Puerto Rico.

In honor of his memory, the Puerto Rican Boxing Commission sponsors the Juan Evangelista Venegas boxing tournament, which serves as a tune-up to future Olympic boxing prospects. There is a Juan Evangelista Venegas Olympic Cup which is given in other sports with Olympic orientation.

Notes

See also

Black history in Puerto Rico
List of Puerto Ricans

References

External links
History of Puerto Rico

 databaseOlympics
 Certificate of Death: Juan Evangelista Venegas Trinidad.  Filed 17 April 1987.  Puerto Rico, Dept. of Health, Div. of Vital Statistics, Reg. Dist. No. 152, File No. 0274 (326).  Informant: Mrs. Nayda Venegas [daughter of deceased], Río Piedras, San Juan, Puerto Rico.

1929 births
1987 deaths
Olympic boxers of Puerto Rico
Boxers at the 1948 Summer Olympics
Olympic bronze medalists for Puerto Rico
People from Río Piedras, Puerto Rico
Bantamweight boxers
Olympic medalists in boxing
Medalists at the 1948 Summer Olympics
Puerto Rican male boxers